Sergije Krešić (born 29 November 1946) is a retired Croatian football manager and former player. Krešić coached a number of lower level sides in Spain, where he is known by the name Sergio Kresic.

Playing career 
He joined Hajduk Split youth team in 1960, becoming a senior in 1965. That same year he played with a neighbouring club RNK Split and a year later returned to Hajduk and became the youth squad coach. After finishing his high-school studies in 1968 he moved to United States where he played indoor football with Cleveland Stokers. Afterwards he returned to Europe to play with Belgian club KSK Beveren. In 1970, he moved back to Yugoslavia and plays first until 1972 with Yugoslav First League club FK Bor, and afterwards between 1972 and 1975 with OFK Beograd. In 1975, he signed with Spanish La Liga side Burgos CF and stayed until 1978. His good attitude and quality exhibitions resulted in him becoming team captain in his last season there, an achievement hard to accomplish in those days for a foreigner. His last season as player was spent back in the States with Houston in 1978.

Coaching career 
Krešić started his coaching career in 1983 as an assistant manager to Petar Nadoveza in Hajduk Split. In 1984 Nadoveza was replaced by Stanko Poklepović, and when Poklepović was sacked in 1986 Krešić took over but did not stay there too long.

After 20 years of coaching in Spain he returned to Hajduk but after a few months he left the club. Krešić is no longer currently coaching CD Numancia, being appointed in July 2008, on 17 February 2009 was let go with Numancia in the Relegation zone of the primera liga. On 17 June 2009 UD Las Palmas have signed the coach until June 2010. In August 2012 he was appointed sporting director at HNK Hajduk Split. After 9 months working as sporting director he was sacked by Hajduk chairman Marin Brbić in April 2013.

Honours

Manager 

 Atlético Marbella
 Tercera División: 1990–91
 Segunda División B: 1991–92

 Mérida
 Segunda División: 1994–95

 Las Palmas
 Segunda División: 1999–00

References

External links
 NPSL and NASL league stats
 
 

1946 births
Living people
Footballers from Split, Croatia
Association football central defenders
Yugoslav footballers
HNK Hajduk Split players
RNK Split players
Cleveland Stokers players
K.S.K. Beveren players
FK Bor players
OFK Beograd players
Burgos CF (1936) footballers
Houston Hurricane players
Yugoslav First League players
North American Soccer League (1968–1984) players
Belgian Pro League players
La Liga players
Yugoslav expatriate footballers
Expatriate soccer players in the United States
Yugoslav expatriate sportspeople in the United States
Expatriate footballers in Belgium
Yugoslav expatriate sportspeople in Belgium
Expatriate footballers in Spain
Yugoslav expatriate sportspeople in Spain
Yugoslav football managers
HNK Hajduk Split managers
Real Burgos CF managers
Croatian football managers
Real Betis managers
CP Mérida managers
Real Valladolid managers
UD Las Palmas managers
RCD Mallorca managers
Recreativo de Huelva managers
Real Murcia managers
CD Numancia managers
Croatian expatriate football managers
Expatriate football managers in Spain
Croatian expatriate sportspeople in Spain